Alan Slavikovich Chochiyev (born 7 September 1991) is a Russian football player with Alania Vladikavkaz. He most often plays as an attacking midfielder or left winger.

Club career
He made his professional debut for FC Volgar-Gazprom Astrakhan on 4 April 2011 in a Russian First Division game against FC Nizhny Novgorod.

On 29 December 2013, he joined PFC Krylia Sovetov Samara. He made his Russian Premier League debut for Krylia Sovetov on 10 March 2014 in a game against FC Lokomotiv Moscow.

On 29 February 2019, he signed with Belarusian club FC Dinamo Minsk until the end of the 2019 season.

On 7 May 2021, he moved to Kazakhstan Premier League club Shakhter Karagandy.

References

External links
 
 
 

1991 births
Sportspeople from Vladikavkaz
Living people
Ossetian people
Ossetian footballers
Russian footballers
Russia youth international footballers
Russia under-21 international footballers
Association football midfielders
FC Lokomotiv Moscow players
FC Volgar Astrakhan players
PFC Krylia Sovetov Samara players
FC Dinamo Minsk players
FC Baltika Kaliningrad players
FC Chayka Peschanokopskoye players
FC Shakhter Karagandy players
Russian Premier League players
Russian First League players
Belarusian Premier League players
Kazakhstan Premier League players
Russian expatriate footballers
Expatriate footballers in Belarus
Russian expatriate sportspeople in Belarus
Expatriate footballers in Kazakhstan
Russian expatriate sportspeople in Kazakhstan